The Association of Nail Technicians commonly referred to as ANT, is a UK trade association, which represents the UK's nail industry on behalf of its members.  They are the main trade association within the UK nail industry.

ANT gives advice to nail technicians as well as help to new start ups from all around the UK.It also runs a register of all the UK's nail technicians which confirms if they are insured.

The Association works with various UK councils implementing licensing schemes.

They have been represented during interviews on radio stations such as BBC Radio 1 and BBC Radio Essex, as well as various UK TV programmes including Watchdog on BBC1.

Current membership has reached over 2000.

You require a formal nail technician qualification to join The Association of Nail Technicians.

History

The Association of Nail Technicians (ANT) was set up in March 1998 due to the demand that from nail technicians that an association was needed to advise and represent the UK’s growing number of nail technicians. A voice was needed to represent the nail industry on serious issues with local councils and licensing but also a point of contact on everyday problems.

The Association of Nail Technicians was the first organisation to offer an insurance scheme with a policy designed specifically for nail technicians.

References

External links
EBAY Guides
Start Ups UK
Input Youth UK
Beauty Treatment Expert
The Association of Nail Technicians (ANT) Website

Beauty
Organisations based in Bradford
Organizations established in 1998
Trade associations based in the United Kingdom
1998 establishments in England